The Church of Santa María de Sariegomuerto is a Romanesque-style, Roman Catholic church in the municipality of Villaviciosa, in the community of Asturias, Spain.

The church appears to date originally from the 12th to 13th centuries; it appears to be mentioned in documents in 921, linked to grants by  Ordoño II to the Oviedo Cathedral. The church has undergone a number of refurbishments along the centuries. The church was rebuilt after arson during the Spanish civil war.

References

Santa María de Sariegomuerto
Santa María de Sariegomuerto
Santa María de Sariegomuerto
Bien de Interés Cultural landmarks in Asturias